Zhang Dinghe (张定和, Hefei, 1916–2011) was a Chinese composer and conductor. He composed the music for the 1958 opera The Tale of Huai Yin, as well as many songs, ballets, and film music.

References

1916 births
2011 deaths
People from Hefei
Chinese conductors (music)
Chinese opera composers
Male opera composers
Musicians from Anhui
Chinese classical composers
Chinese male classical composers